Javier Frana defeated Emilio Sánchez 7–5, 3–6, 6–3 to win the 1993 Movistar Open singles competition.

Seeds

  Jaime Yzaga (semifinals)
  Richard Fromberg (second round, retired)
  Alberto Berasategui (second round)
  Luiz Mattar (second round)
  Emilio Sánchez (final)
  Fabrice Santoro (first round)
  Younes El Aynaoui (second round)
  Àlex Corretja (second round)

Draw

Finals

Top half

Bottom half

References

External links
 Singles draw

Singles